Badanga is a village in Udaipur district in the Indian state of Rajasthan. As per Population Census 2011, literacy rate of Badanga village was 35.28% which is very low compared to 66.11% of Rajasthan. The District headquarter of the village is Udaipur.

References 

Villages in Udaipur district